Rex McDougall (13 December 1878 – 30 August 1933) was an English stage and film actor. He was born as Reginald McDougall in Kensington, London, England, UK and died at age 54 in Marylebone, London, England, UK.

Selected filmography
 Please Help Emily (1917)
 A Daughter of the Old South (1918)
 The Beloved Blackmailer (1918)
 Le Secret du Lone Star (1920)
 The Bargain (1921)
 The Knight Errant (1922)
 The Hound of the Baskervilles (1921)
 A Gipsy Cavalier (1922)

References

External links

 
 IBDb.com; as Rex McDougal

1878 births
1933 deaths
English male film actors
English male silent film actors
English male stage actors
Male actors from London